Interstate 580 (I-580) is an approximately  east–west auxiliary Interstate Highway in Northern California. The heavily traveled spur route of I-80 runs from US Route 101 (US 101) in San Rafael in the San Francisco Bay Area to I-5 at a point outside the southern city limits of Tracy in the Central Valley. I-580 forms a concurrency with I-80 between Albany and Oakland, the latter of which is the location of the MacArthur Maze interchange immediately east of the San Francisco–Oakland Bay Bridge. I-580 provides a connection from the Bay Area to the southern San Joaquin Valley and Southern California via I-5, as I-5 bypasses the Bay Area to the east.

A portion of I-580 is called the MacArthur Freeway, after General Douglas MacArthur. Other portions are named the John T. Knox Freeway (after a former speaker pro tempore of the California State Assembly), the Eastshore Freeway (after its location on San Francisco Bay), the Arthur H. Breed Jr. Freeway (after a former California State assemblyperson and senator—the stretch itself lying between the cities of Castro Valley and Dublin), the William Elton "Brownie" Brown Freeway (after a Tracy resident instrumental in determining the route of I-5 through the San Joaquin Valley), the Sgt. Daniel Sakai Memorial Highway (after the Castro Valley resident and Oakland SWAT officer killed in the 2009 shootings of Oakland police officers), and the John P. Miller Memorial Highway (after the Lodi resident and California Highway Patrol officer killed while chasing down a DUI driver).

Route description

The interchange with US 101 is incomplete, only allowing continuous travel from southbound US 101 to eastbound I-580 (via exit 451B) and from westbound I-580 to northbound US 101. Heading eastward through the light industrial portion of eastern San Rafael, I-580 provides access to San Quentin State Prison at the eastern tip of land before joining the Richmond–San Rafael Bridge to cross San Francisco Bay. I-580 enters the city of Richmond in Contra Costa County midspan, then continues through Richmond to join I-80 in Albany at the "Hoffman Split".

After joining I-80, I-580 runs directly south for several miles along the eastern shore of San Francisco Bay in the segment known as the Eastshore Freeway, then enters the MacArthur Maze. The segment between the Hoffman Split and the MacArthur Maze is a wrong-way concurrency, meaning I-580 east is signed as I-80 west, and vice versa. From the MacArthur Maze, I-580 is known as the MacArthur Freeway, which runs through Oakland and San Leandro to Castro Valley. About halfway to Castro Valley from the Maze, is an interchange with the Warren Freeway (State Route 13 [SR 13]). Between this interchange and Castro Valley, I-580 runs near or along the trace of the Hayward Fault, a major branch of the San Andreas Fault.

In Castro Valley, I-580 turns eastward toward Dublin Canyon before descending into Dublin and Pleasanton. After passing through Livermore, the freeway enters the Altamont Pass. The road emerges in the Central Valley west of Tracy, where, after I-205 splits near Altamont Raceway Park, it turns southeastward and terminates by merging with I-5 south of Tracy just shy of the Stanislaus County line.

I-580 through Altamont Pass is a major crossing of the Diablo Range, linking the Central Valley to the Bay Area, and also a major route to Southern California. I-580 is the only freeway that crosses the Diablo Range, making it the safest route through the mountains. Prior to the construction of this route, traffic was detoured to Pacheco (SR 152) and Polonio (SR 46) passes.

I-580 provides Interstate Highway access between San Francisco and Los Angeles since I-5 runs east of the Bay Area. However, the primary control city listed on freeway signs along eastbound I-580 between I-80 and I-205 is instead Stockton, a vestige of when this segment used to be part of US 50.

I-580 is part of the California Freeway and Expressway System and is part of the National Highway System, a network of highways that are considered essential to the country's economy, defense, and mobility by the Federal Highway Administration (FHWA). The route is eligible for the State Scenic Highway System and is officially designated as a scenic highway by the California Department of Transportation (Caltrans) from the San Leandro city limits to SR 24 and from I-5 to I-205, meaning that these are substantial sections of highway passing through a "memorable landscape" with no "visual intrusions", where the potential designation has gained popular favor with the community.

Truck ban through Oakland
Specifically, eastbound trucks cannot travel beyond Grand Avenue/Lakeshore Avenue (exit 21B), and those going westbound must get off at MacArthur Boulevard/Foothill Boulevard (exit 30). They are instead instructed to take I-238 in Castro Valley and then I-880 through Oakland as an alternative route. The California Highway Patrol may however temporarily lift the ban for short periods to reduce traffic congestion when major accidents occur on I-880 or I-238.

The truck prohibition has been in effect before the freeway was since the freeway was built in 1963 as part of US 50. Both the FHWA and Caltrans imposed the restriction, partly because the city of Oakland already had a truck ban through the area prior to the freeway's construction. Since then, the restriction was grandfathered in when the freeway was both renumbered and added to the Interstate Highway System.

As a result, it is the only segment of Interstate Highway in California that is not part of the National Truck Network (several other California state highways have similar truck bans such as SR 2 and SR 85, but not any other Interstates). With trucks normally rerouted onto I-880 instead of I-580 through Oakland, the former generally gets more traffic than the latter. For decades, the trucking industry lobbied to have the ban removed but was unsuccessful due to local opposition. In 2000, the California State Legislature passed Assembly Bill 500, adding the I-580 truck restriction into the California Vehicle Code.

A collaborative study by the Environmental Defense Fund, Google, and the University of Texas at Austin used Google Street View cars equipped with air quality monitors to measure pollution data through Oakland. It found that along I-880, concentrations of black carbon were 80 percent higher, concentrations of nitrogen dioxide were 60 percent higher, and concentrations of nitric oxide were at least double than those along I-580. This has led community leaders to revisit the truck ban, particularly because I-880 runs along minority communities while I-580 runs through middle and upper middle class neighborhoods. Once a proponent of the ban when he served on the Oakland City Council in the 1990s, Alameda County Supervisor Nate Miley held a December 2021 virtual town hall on the issue, and asked both Caltrans and the Bay Area Air Quality Management District to conduct studies on the ban. He did however concede that the California State Legislature would have to eventually repeal the aforementioned rule in the California Vehicle Code for any change to occur.

Tolls

Richmond–San Rafael Bridge

Tolls are collected only for westbound traffic on the Richmond–San Rafael Bridge. An open road tolling system is used on the bridge, and they can be paid by either a FasTrak transponder or license plate tolling. The high-occupancy vehicle (HOV) lane leading to the bridge requires a car with three or more people.

Express lanes
High-occupancy toll (HOT) lanes along I-580 between Pleasanton and Livermore opened in February 2016. The eastbound express lanes stretch  between Hacienda Drive and North Greenville Road.

, the HOT lanes' hours of operation is weekdays between 5:00 am and 8:00 pm. Solo drivers are tolled using a congestion pricing system based on the real-time levels of traffic. Carpools, motorcycles, and clean air vehicles are not charged. All tolls are collected using an open road tolling system, and therefore there are no toll booths to receive cash. Each vehicle using the HOT lanes is required to carry either a FasTrak Flex or CAV (Clean Air Vehicle) transponder, with its switch set to indicate the number of the vehicle's occupants (1, 2, or 3 or more). Solo drivers may also use the FasTrak standard tag without the switch. Drivers without any FasTrak tag will be assessed a toll violation regardless of whether they qualified for free.

History

I-5W and the San Francisco Bay Area

Interstate 5W (I-5W) was originally conceived as part of a loop Interstate with a directional suffix and was what is now I-580 from I-5 to Oakland. However, I-5W and most of the other Interstates around the country with directional suffixes were eventually renumbered or eliminated, except for I-35E and I-35W in Texas and Minnesota, and more recently I-69W, I-69C, and I-69E in Texas. The former route of I-5W now corresponds to I-580 from I-5 to Oakland, I-80 from Oakland to Vacaville, and I-505 from Vacaville to I-5 near Dunnigan.

I-5 to Castro Valley
For the most part, the I-580 freeway in this segment was constructed over or alongside the right-of-way of US 50, previously part of the old Lincoln Highway, during the course of the late 1960s and early 1970s.  The segment which begins at the split with I-205 was constructed during the same period of time over a new right-of-way to a junction with I-5, running through some low hills on the west side of the San Joaquin Valley near the city of Patterson.

In the 1990s, the freeway segment from Castro Valley through Pleasanton was enlarged and otherwise reengineered in conjunction with the construction of the Dublin/Pleasanton–Daly City line of the Bay Area Rapid Transit (BART). The BART tracks were placed in a new median between the westbound and eastbound lanes of I-580 as was the new Dublin/Pleasantion station. The interchange with I-238 and the Hayward exit ramps was also reengineered at this time.

MacArthur Freeway: Castro Valley to Oakland
The I-580 freeway in this segment was constructed starting in February 1960, adjacent to the city streets which were part of US 50 between Castro Valley and the large interchange along the eastern approach to the San Francisco–Oakland Bay Bridge in Oakland now called the MacArthur Maze. The freeway was named in honor of World War II General Douglas MacArthur. Prior to the construction of this freeway, the various city streets of Oakland that were designated for US 50 (principally 38th Street, Hopkins Street, Moss Avenue, Excelsior Avenue, and part of Foothill Boulevard) had been renamed for the General as "MacArthur Boulevard" which, for the most part, still parallels the MacArthur Freeway. The renaming occurred on March 26, 1942, by a resolution of the Oakland City Council.

The freeway was opened to traffic in eight segments until its completion in May 1966 (last segment, connecting with SR 238 (now I-238), in Castro Valley, opened May 20, 1966).

Oakland to San Rafael
The segment of I-580 running from the MacArthur Maze to San Rafael is the most recent to be signed as I-580, beginning in 1984. Before 1984, this segment was part of SR 17.

From the Maze to the interchange locally known as the "Hoffman Split" in Albany, just north of the Gilman Street interchange (Hoffman Boulevard was the predecessor of I-580 in this section), I-580 follows the Eastshore Freeway, a wrong-way concurrency with I-80 for its entirety: northward on the Eastshore is signed I-80 east and I-580 west; headed southward, one finds signs indicating I-80 west and I-580 east.

At the Hoffman Split, I-580 leaves the Eastshore Freeway in a northwesterly direction through the cities of Albany and Richmond. It then crosses San Francisco Bay over the Richmond–San Rafael Bridge. The freeway in this section, officially named the John T. Knox Freeway, was constructed from 1987 to 1991. It replaced a number of city streets which comprised the earlier highway leading to the San Rafael Bridge, principally, Hoffman and Cutting boulevards.

After crossing the bridge, I-580 runs west to San Rafael, ending at an interchange with US 101. This freeway segment supplanted an earlier boulevard constructed as part of SR 17.

Interstate 180

Interstate 180 (I-180) was a temporary designation used in 1978 for the Richmond–San Rafael Bridge, now part of I-580. At the time, the bridge had been identified as part of SR 17 but was marked for inclusion in the Interstate Highway System.

Briefly the bridge used the number 180, despite the Fresno-area SR 180's use of the number. The California Streets and Highways Code has a policy against using one route number for multiple noncontiguous highways. Unless the existing SR 180 is renumbered, which is unlikely due to its familiarity as the road to Kings Canyon National Park, there will not be an I-180 in California.

Future
The segment of I-580 from I-680 to I-205 is undergoing significant expansion. Among the projects along this segment is the now-completed high-occupancy vehicle lanes in each direction, a westbound auxiliary lane between Fallon and Tassajara roads, the now-completed construction of a new interchange at Isabel Avenue in Livermore, the reconstruction of several interchanges, the construction of additional truck climbing lanes for the eastward ascent to the Altamont Pass, and plans to preserve the right-of-way to accommodate a future BART extension in the median of the freeway.

Exit list

In popular culture
 I-580 features prominently throughout the Sons of Anarchy series. The backstory of the series establishes that "First 9" (SAMCRO cofounder) John Teller died in a collision on November 13, 1993, 15 years before the pilot episode takes place, and SAMCRO establishes a roadside memorial to Teller near the crash site. In the final scenes of the series finale, Jax rides his father's restored classic motorcycle to visit that memorial, before taking a last ride on I-580.
 I-580 through the Altamont Pass is a stage in the 2011 racing video game Need for Speed: The Run.

Notes

See also

References

External links

Bay Area FasTrak – includes toll information on the I-580 Express Lanes, the Richmond–San Rafael Bridge, and the other Bay Area toll facilities
California @ AARoads.com - I-580
Caltrans: Route580 highway conditions
California Highways: I-580
CA Highways

80-5
Lincoln Highway
580
80-5 California
U.S. Route 50
5 California
Interstate 80-5
Interstate 80-5
Interstate 80-5
Interstate 80-5
580